Vice Admiral Robert Stuart Lambert (2 April 1771 – 16 September 1836) was a Royal Navy officer who became commander-in-chief of the Cape of Good Hope Station.

Naval career
Lambert joined the Royal Navy in circa 1790 and, having been promoted to captain he was given command of the third-rate HMS Duncan in 1812. He became commander-in-chief of the Cape of Good Hope Station in 1820. His responsibilities included command of the British garrison on Saint Helena where Napoleon died in May 1821.

References

External links
 

Royal Navy vice admirals
1771 births
1836 deaths